Bjørn Erlend Dæhlie (born 19 June 1967) is a Norwegian businessman and retired cross-country skier.  From 1992 to 1999, Dæhlie won the Nordic World Cup six times, finishing second in 1994 and 1998. Dæhlie won a total of 29 medals in the Olympics and World Championships between 1991 and 1999, making him the most successful male cross-country skier in history.

During his career, Dæhlie measured a VO2 max of 96 ml/kg/min. Dæhlie's result was achieved out of season, and physiologist Erlend Hem who was responsible for the testing stated that he would not discount the possibility of the skier passing 100 ml/kg/min at his absolute peak.

Since retiring, Dæhlie has become a successful businessman in real estate and fashion. His real estate investments have produced a fortune of more than half a billion kroner.

Early life and career
Born in Elverum, Norway, Dæhlie later moved to Nannestad, where he settled down. Dæhlie attributes much of his success in sports to his upbringing where he was active in hunting, fishing, hiking, kayaking, football and, of course, skiing from a very early age. For much of his childhood Dæhlie wanted to be a football player, but after being prompted by a coach, he tried Nordic skiing. Dæhlie did not have immediate success as a junior racer, but he consistently improved and eventually qualified for the FIS World Cup competitions.

In 2018 he claimed that his family comes from Alvdal; the claim was made while answering the public during a meeting prior to getting municipal recommendation in regard to building what media calls "his Coop store" - a store in the chain Coop.

Athletic career
Dæhlie was first on the Norwegian skiing team for the 1988 Winter Olympics in Calgary, Canada. However, he did not participate in any races and was there to learn from more senior skiers. He later claimed these Olympics were the turning point for Norwegian skiing before their following period of success. He made his debut in the World Cup in January 1989, finishing 11th on 15 km freestyle in Kavgolovo. In December the same year, he won his first World Cup race. He finished first on the 15 km freestyle, the first World Cup race of the season.

In the FIS Nordic World Ski Championships 1991 in Val di Fiemme, Dæhlie won his first World Championship gold medal. He beat skiing legend Gunde Svan on the 15 km freestyle. The medal was unexpected, since Dæhlie was young and still unknown. It was Norway's first individual male gold medal in the World Championships since Oddvar Brå won gold in the same race in Oslo in 1982. Dæhlie also skied the last leg on the winning 4 × 10 km relay team.

In 1992, Dæhlie's period of dominance started. He won the World Cup overall for the first time, a feat he would accomplish five more times in the next seven years. In Albertville Dæhlie won his first Olympic medals. He won gold in 10/15 km freestyle pursuit, 50 km freestyle and was on the winning team for the 4 × 10 km relay. He won a silver in 30 km classical style. Dæhlie also finished fourth on the 10 km freestyle, where his teammate Vegard Ulvang won the gold. Dæhlie completed the fourth leg of the relay, and crossed the finishing line backwards, having won by a margin of over one and a half minutes. Dæhlie and Ulvang completed a clean sweep of the cross-country skiing gold medals, each winning three golds and a silver. Dæhlie was awarded Fearnley's Olympic Prize for his performance, a prize given to the best performing Norwegian athlete in the Olympics.

In the 1994 Winter Olympics in Lillehammer, Norway, Dæhlie won gold in the 10 km classical style and the 15 km freestyle pursuit. He won silver in the 30 km freestyle, where he was beaten by Thomas Alsgaard. The 4 × 10 km relay was a very tight race between Norway and Italy. The Italians won the gold after Silvio Fauner beat Dæhlie on the sprint on the last leg. In later years, Thomas Alsgaard took over the fourth leg on the Norwegian relay team with Dæhlie skiing the third leg, since Alsgaard was the better sprinter.

The 1997 Skiing World Championships were Dæhlie's most successful World Championships. In front of the home crowd in Trondheim he won a medal in every race, taking gold in the 10 km classical race, the 10+15 km combined pursuit and the 4 × 10 km relay. In addition he won a silver in the 30 km freestyle and bronze in the 50 km classical. Dæhlie said the championships were like "Lillehammer all over again" and that "For me, it's very special to compete in Norway".

Dæhlie won three golds and one silver in his last Olympics in Nagano. He won the 10 km classical style, the 50 km freestyle and the 4 × 10 km skiing relay. In the 15 km freestyle pursuit, he got a silver medal having been beaten by Thomas Alsgaard on the sprint. Dæhlie won the 50 km freestyle ahead of Niklas Jonsson by only eight seconds. Both skiers collapsed on the finishing line, having given everything in pursuit of victory. Dæhlie described the race as his hardest race ever. Dæhlie also formed a lasting friendship with Phillip Boit, the Kenyan skier. Dæhlie waited for Boit on the finish line for 20 minutes following the 10 km race, saying Boit deserved encouragement. Philip went on to name one of his children Dæhlie Boit.

Dæhlie was planning to compete in the 2002 Winter Olympics in Salt Lake City, but he was prevented from participating by a career-ending roller skiing accident in August 1999. The resulting back injury prevented Dæhlie from adding more medals to his collection. He retired from the sport in March 2001, having tried extensive rehabilitation and surgery to come back. His decision to retire shocked the nation of Norway, where Dæhlie was idolized for his great winning record.

Dæhlie's eight Olympic titles are a record for the Winter Olympics, as are his total of 12 Olympic medals (he also won four silver medals) which he amassed in three Olympics (Albertville, Lillehammer and Nagano). In addition to his achievements at the Olympics he had great success in the World Championships where he won 17 medals of which nine were gold medals. He was particularly successful in the Trondheim 1997 World Championships, where he earned medals in all five events. Despite his unanticipated early exit from the sport, Dæhlie is considered by many to be one of the greatest Winter Olympic athletes of all time. In his illustrious career, Dæhlie never won a race at the Holmenkollen ski festival, but he was still awarded the Holmenkollen medal in 1997 (shared with Bjarte Engen Vik and Stefania Belmondo).

He also supports non-profit organisations that work for causes such as multiple sclerosis. In 2009 Dæhlie raced in the American Birkebeiner as a fundraiser for multiple sclerosis. Dæhlie competed in the classic race, which is 54 km long, finishing second in a photo finish.

In 2011, Dæhlie won the downhill event in the Kicksled World Championships in Hurdal.
Also in 2011, Dæhlie announced a comeback, stating his intention to participate in long-distance races like Marcialonga and Vasaloppet

Dæhlie also participated in long-distance running in his youth, representing Ullensaker/Kisa IL. He participated in the Nordic junior match versus Denmark/Iceland, Finland and Sweden in 1987.

Cross-country skiing results
All results are sourced from the International Ski Federation (FIS).

Olympic Games
 12 medals – (8 gold, 4 silver)

World Championships
 17 medals – (9 gold, 5 silver, 3 bronze)

World Cup

Season titles
 8 titles – (6 overall, 2 sprint)

Season standings

Individual podiums
 46 victories 
 81 podiums

Team podiums
 16 victories
 27 podiums 

Note:   Until the 1999 World Championships and the 1994 Olympics, World Championship and Olympic races were included in the World Cup scoring system.

See also
 List of multiple Olympic gold medalists
 List of multiple Olympic gold medalists at a single Games
 List of multiple Winter Olympic medalists

References

External links

 
 
 
 
  – click Holmenkollmedaljen for downloadable pdf file 

1967 births
Cross-country skiers at the 1992 Winter Olympics
Cross-country skiers at the 1994 Winter Olympics
Cross-country skiers at the 1998 Winter Olympics
Holmenkollen medalists
Living people
Norwegian male cross-country skiers
People from Bø, Nordland
People from Elverum
Olympic cross-country skiers of Norway
Olympic gold medalists for Norway
Olympic silver medalists for Norway
Norwegian businesspeople
Olympic medalists in cross-country skiing
FIS Nordic World Ski Championships medalists in cross-country skiing
FIS Cross-Country World Cup champions
Medalists at the 1998 Winter Olympics
Medalists at the 1994 Winter Olympics
Medalists at the 1992 Winter Olympics
Ullensaker/Kisa IL athletes